The Invisibles is a comic book series by Grant Morrison.

The Invisibles may also refer to:

The Invisibles (film), a 2017 German holocaust docudrama
"The Invisibles" (The Outer Limits), an episode of The Outer Limits
"The Invisibles", a song by Suede on the 2018 album The Blue Hour
The Invisibles (TV series), the BBC TV Series

See also
Invisible (disambiguation)
 Invisibles, a film featuring work by Wim Wenders
The Invincibles (disambiguation)
The Incredibles (disambiguation)